Pat Finlay (born 18 March 1938) is an English footballer, who played as a winger in the Football League for Tranmere Rovers.

References

External links

Tranmere Rovers F.C. players
Association football wingers
English Football League players
1938 births
Living people
English footballers